Passacaglia is a solo piano composition by the composer Leopold Godowsky. It was completed in New  York, on October 21, 1927. The composition commemorates the one hundredth anniversary of the death of Franz Schubert. Typical of Godowsky's composition style, the piece contains dense contrapuntal, polyphonic, and chromatic writing.

Historical background 

Godowsky remarked in the work's preface:

Description of form

The work is a passacaglia based on the first 8 measures of Schubert's Unfinished Symphony. The theme is stated exactly, but with an F# added at the start which aids in transition between the variations. There are forty-four variations, followed by an epilogue, a cadenza, and then closing with a four-part fugue, following the pattern established for this form by the likes of Bach (Passacaglia and Fugue in C minor, BWV 582) and Brahms (Variations and Fugue on a Theme by Handel). The writing makes stylistic references to Brahms himself (variations 31-35, 38 & 39), as well as Chopin (variations 9 & 27), Rachmaninoff (variations 19, 20 & 24), and others (Scarlatti, Ravel, and Richard Strauss). In variation 39 there is an obvious reference to Schubert's Erlkönig. Schubert's Fantaisie in F minor (var.42) and the famous string ostinato that follows the opening of the original symphony (end of fugue) are quoted as well.

Reactions
The Passacaglia gained notoriety after pianist Vladimir Horowitz reportedly gave up on the piece, claiming that six hands were required to play it. Abram Chasins, who heard Godowsky perform this piece in one of his gatherings, remarked, "This was sheer enchantment, both the work itself and Godowsky's pianism. It had the cool, colorful clarity of a stained-glass window. Although I was greatly moved and impressed by what I heard, Godowsky's effortless mastery made me unaware of the vastness of his pianistic feat that night."

Publication
The Passacaglia is currently copyrighted by Carl Fischer, Inc. and is published within The Godowsky Collection, Vol. 1: Original Compositions for Piano Solo.

Notes

References

External links
 
 Discography of Godowsky's Passacaglia
 Artem Borissov plays Godowsky's Passacaglia LIVE

Compositions by Leopold Godowsky
Compositions for solo piano
Variations
1927 compositions
Compositions in B minor